Kyle Rivard Glacier is a glacier about  long at the head of Marshall Valley in Victoria Land. The glacier was observed and mapped by Troy L. Pewe, glacial geologist with U.S. Navy Operation Deepfreeze, 1957–58. Named by Pewe for Norman Rivard who was his assistant on this expedition.
 

Glaciers of Victoria Land
Scott Coast